Flair is a 1990 Australian miniseries about an American designer who wants to break into the Australian fashion industry.

Two part mini-series in which Tessa Clarke (US actress Heather Thomas), a fashion designer, returns home to Australia from America intent on becoming a major player in the Australian fashion industry. Her success leads to bitter jealousy amongst her rivals and she also has problems when a one-time employee. Pamela Winter-Smith, manages to win a court case claiming back her designs.

Cast

 Heather Thomas - Tessa Clarke
 Andrew Clarke - Phillip Harmon
 James Healey - Chris Drake
 Rowena Wallace - Pamela Winter-Smith
 Joseph Bottoms - Matt Lee
 Charles Tingwell - Bert Clarke
 Imogen Annesley - Sally Clarke
 David Reyne - Mark Tupper
 Elaine Smith - Megan
 Briony Behets - Samantha Harmon
 Khym Lam - Mira

Episodes

Home media 
Flair has yet to be released for home media in any form.

References

External links
Flair at IMDb

1990s Australian television miniseries
1990 Australian television series debuts
1990 Australian television series endings
1990 television films
1990 films
Films directed by Henri Safran
English-language television shows